Maoricicada, commonly known as black cicadas or mountain black cicadas, is a genus of cicada in the family Cicadidae. This genus is endemic to New Zealand.

Species
 Maoricicada alticola Dugdale and Fleming 1978
 Maoricicada campbelli (Myers 1923)
 Maoricicada cassiope (Hudson 1891)
 Maoricicada clamitans Dugdale and Fleming 1978 
 Maoricicada hamiltoni (Myers 1926) 
 Maoricicada iolanthe (Hudson 1891)
 Maoricicada lindsayi (Myers 1923)
 Maoricicada mangu (White, 1879) 
 Maoricicada mangu celer Dugdale and Fleming 1978 
  Maoricicada mangu gourlayi Dugdale and Fleming 1978 
 Maoricicada mangu multicostata Dugdale and Fleming 1978
 Maoricicada myersi (Fleming 1971)
 Maoricicada nigra (Myers 1921)
 Maoricicada nigra frigida Dugdale and Fleming 1978 
 Maoricicada oromelaena (Myers 1926)
 Maoricicada otagoensis Dugdale and Fleming 1978
 Maoricicada otagoensis maceweni Dugdale and Fleming 1978
 Maoricicada phaeoptera Dugdale and Fleming 1978
 Maoricicada tenuis Dugdale and Fleming 1978

References

Cicadas of New Zealand
Cicadettini
Cicadidae genera